La Garce is a 1984 French thriller film directed by Christine Pascal and starring Isabelle Huppert and Richard Berry.

Cast
 Isabelle Huppert as Aline Kaminker / Édith Weber
 Richard Berry as Lucien Sabatier
 Vittorio Mezzogiorno as Max Halimi
 Jean Benguigui as Rony
 Jean-Claude Leguay as Brunet
 Jean-Pierre Moulin as Cordet
 Clément Harari as Samuel Weber
 Daniel Jégou as Dujarric
 Jenny Clève as Madame Beffroit
 Jean-Pierre Bagot as Monsieur Beffroit
 Madeleine Marie as Gouvernante de Weber
 Bérangère Bonvoisin as Lucien's wife
 Mado Maurin as Pasquet
 Philippe Fretun as Didier
 Vicky Messica as Nando
 Stéphanie Seilhean as Edwige
 Brigitte Guillermet as Brunet's secretary
 Michèle Moretti as The redhead
 Julie Malbequi as Little girl

See also
 Isabelle Huppert on screen and stage

References

External links

1984 thriller films
1980s French-language films
Films directed by Christine Pascal
French thriller films
1980s French films